Kosta Novaković (Serbian Cyrillic: Коста Новаковић; 3 June 1886 in Čačak – 1939 in Moscow, USSR) was a Serbian and Yugoslav socialist politician, journalist and professor and one of the most prominent in the Serbian left-wing politics of the 20th century.

He was a prominent member of the Serbian Social Democratic Party in the Kingdom of Serbia and one of the founders and leaders of the Communist Party of Yugoslavia.

He was the editor of the leftist newspapers "Radnicke novine", "Radnik" and "Borba". As a Serbian soldier, he was in Albania during the Balkan Wars, informing the public about the atrocities committed there.

His most significant literary work is "Macedonia to Macedonians, Land to the Peasants", for which he was sentenced to prison by the authorities of Kingdom of Yugoslavia. After the ban of the Communist Party of Yugoslavia legal activity he emigrated from the Kingdom of Yugoslavia to the Soviet Union, where he continues his political actions.

During the Stalinist purges in 1939, he was shot dead along with many other leading Yugoslav communists.

References

Yugoslav communists
Executed Yugoslav people
Great Purge victims from Yugoslavia
Soviet rehabilitations
People granted political asylum in the Soviet Union
Executed communists